Maltepe is a district in Istanbul, Turkey, on the northern shore of the Sea of Marmara. It touches Kadıköy district to the west, Kartal to the east and Ataşehir to the northwest. The mayor of Maltepe is Ali Kılıç (CHP).

History
In Byzantine times, the area was known as Bryas. In ca. 837, the emperor Theophilos (r. 829–842) erected here a palace in Arab style, inspired by the palaces of the Abbasids in Baghdad, described to him by his ambassador to the Abbasid court, John Grammatikos. A ruin in nearby Küçükyalı has been identified as it.

This coast has been a retreat from the city since Byzantine and Ottoman times, and right up until the 1970s was a rural area peppered with summer homes for wealthy Istanbul residents. Being on the suburban railway line Maltepe was a favorite spot for day-trippers or weekenders to visit the beach and many summer houses were built there. Many of these houses remain but now Maltepe is no longer a beach retreat.

Maltepe today
The population grew rapidly from the 70's onwards when, following the building of the Bosphorus Bridge, it became possible to commute from here to the city. Medium of transport in today's Maltepe is done by rail and road. Railway is the route where old Maltepe was established between Maltepe's D-100 Highway and Marmara Sea. The highway divides Maltepe into three parts. This road connects Maltepe to Anatolia and the side roads to the neighboring districts. The second important highway is Bağdat Avenue. The street starts from Kızıltoprak in Kadıköy and continues until Cevizli in Maltepe.

Maltepe was badly damaged due to the  İzmit earthquake 1999 and most of the high-rise apartments blocks needed structural repairs, although some of the buildings in the district have been demolished over the years and replaced by new buildings, but some of them still have structural damage cracks.

The D-100 highway divides Maltepe into two horizontally. North of the highway is Başıbüyük, the slightly poorer area of Maltepe, a wooded hill on which the hospital (formerly Istanbul's tuberculosis isolation hospital) and also a large cemetery are located. However, today, the proportions of the part of Maltepe under the highway are slightly more developed than the part on the upper side. Between 1992 and 2004, it bordered Ümraniye from the northwest. However, in 1994, Yeni Çamlıca District was changed to Ümraniye and Ferhatpaşa District was transferred to Samandıra of Kartal district in 2004. The departure of Ferhatpaşa ends the neighbouring relationship between Maltepe and Ümraniye.

Maltepe is home to one of the largest mosques in Istanbul, named Cumhuriyet Mosque, which was built in the 2000s. There is a bookstore and a supermarket under the mosque. The Mosque has been built according to the traditional standard shape of a Turkish Mosque (rounded shape with 4 minarets) but internally it is particularly impressive with a tall high dome, a large gallery and balcony where women may pray. The galleries have carved wood frames and there are several large tiled mosaics around the Mosque of various sights of importance to Islam and Muslims. The Mosque has become something of a central point for Maltepe as it both can be seen from a considerable distance and is a central stop for buses and minibuses taking commuters from Kadıköy to the outskirts of the city.

Maltepe was also famous for its coastline and beach in the past. Since it is located right across the Princes' Islands, it hosted local visitors from other districts of Istanbul to watch the Islands and swim on the beach. Closer to the sea, inside the city one can find almost a 'village' with many small winding streets and quaint old houses often called 'old Maltepe'.

Amenities
Maltepe is just a little far from the city. It is a busy shopping district which has some big supermarkets, branches of some pastry shops and all the other modern amenities. In addition to these, Maltepe has many cinemas, fast-food places, and famous kabab houses. And there is the sea shore, where there are cafes and some bars and cafes with live music similar (but on a much smaller scale) to those found in Kadıköy or in Taksim (on the European side of the city). Public transportation in Maltepe is generally provided by Metro, Marmaray, buses and minibuses.

Geography
Maltepe is located in the southwestern part of the Kocaeli Peninsula, on the Marmara Sea coast of Istanbul. Maltepe has approximately 7 km of coastline to the Marmara Sea. The district is quite hilly, with a highest peak at 440m. The seaside is covered with sand and clay and silica from the coast.

Climate 
Maltepe experiences a Mediterranean climate (Csa/Cs) according to both Köppen and Trewartha climate classifications, with cool winters and warm to hot summers. Its position in the south of Istanbul gives  it a relatively warm climate, and places it in the 9a USDA hardiness zone, as well as AHS heat zone 4. It is, however, considerably cooler than Kartal, the district to its southeast.

Politics
Maltepe, which became a separate district after leaving Kartal district on 1 November 1992, experienced its first local election in 1994. At the end of this election, ANAP candidate Bahtiyar Uyanık was elected as the first mayor of Maltepe with 32.98% of the votes. In the later 1999 elections, although his votes fell to 24.07%, he was re-elected mayor. He transferred his seat to AK Party candidate Fikri Köse, who received 43.01% of the votes in the 2004 elections. In the 2009 elections, with 51.39% of the votes, Prof. Dr. Mustafa Zengin was elected mayor. In the 2014 elections, Ali Kılıç, the CHP candidate, was elected mayor with 49.34% of the votes. In 2019 local election, Ali Kılıç was nominated again. And it took 52.74% of the votes and elected a mayor for the second time.

Transport
Metro
M4 Kadıköy - Sabiha Gökçen Airport metro line

Train Line
Marmaray Train Line (Halkalı - Gebze)

Ferryboat
İDO Bostancı-Maltepe

References

External links

 
Populated places in Istanbul Province
Districts of Istanbul Province